Arrifana is a civil parish in the municipality of Vila Nova de Poiares, Portugal. The population in 2011 was 1,440, in an area of 23.84 km².

References

Freguesias of Vila Nova de Poiares